PSAS can mean:
Polytechnic Of Sultan Azlan Shah
Port Said American School, a private school near Cairo, Egypt
The plural of a public service announcement
Persistent Sexual Arousal Syndrome, now called Persistent Genital Arousal Disorder, a medical disorder characterized by ongoing sexual arousal
Proceedings of the Society of Antiquaries of Scotland, an archaeological journal

fr:PSAS